Eric Riley (born June 2, 1970) is an American former professional basketball player who was selected by the Dallas Mavericks in the second round (33rd pick overall) of the 1993 NBA draft. Riley played for the Mavericks, Houston Rockets, Los Angeles Clippers, Minnesota Timberwolves and Boston Celtics in five NBA seasons, averaging 3.1 points per game. He was an injured reserve member of the 1993–94 Houston Rockets who won the NBA championship.

Born in Cleveland, Ohio, he played for Cleveland's St. Joseph High School and then collegiately at the University of Michigan. At Michigan, he redshirted on the 1989 NCAA national champion Wolverines team, and then was the sixth man on Michigan's 1991–92 & 1992–93 Fab Five teams that reached the 1992 & 1993 NCAA Men's Division I Basketball Championship final game.

College career
In 1991, as a sophomore, Riley led the entire 1990–91 Michigan team in both rebounding and blocked shots.  In fact, Riley was second in the Big Ten Conference in rebounds for the 1990–91 season. He earned honorable mention All-Big Ten recognition in 1991. On the Fab Five teams, Riley led all reserve players in points, rebounds and blocks. After being relegated to reserve status following the arrival of the Fab Five, he had the best game of his career in the Southeast Regional semifinals of the 1992 NCAA Division I men's basketball tournament.

Professional career
Riley's draft rights were acquired by the Houston Rockets in a trade made prior to the 1993 NBA Draft. Riley spent his rookie season on the 1993–94 Rockets, coached by fellow Michigan alumnus Rudy Tomjanovich, who won the franchise's first NBA title. Though a member of the team, Riley was put on the injured list prior to the playoffs. Riley was waived on December 12, 1994 but was soon acquired by the Los Angeles Clippers. During his playing career (1993–2004), Riley played for a total of five NBA franchises, as well as several professional teams outside the United States.

Later work
In 2009 Eric Riley started a non-profit called High Rise Foundation. HRF is a non-profit charity with the mission to mentor young adults through sports programs, sports clinics and academic tutoring.

References

External links
NBA.com page
Eric Riley @ basketball-reference.com
 Eric Riley @ basketballreference.com
University of Michigan Basketball Statistical Archive

1970 births
Living people
AEL Limassol B.C. players
African-American basketball players
American expatriate basketball people in China
American expatriate basketball people in Cyprus
American expatriate basketball people in Greece
American expatriate basketball people in Italy
American expatriate basketball people in Venezuela
American men's basketball players
Apollon Patras B.C. players
Basketball players from Ohio
Boston Celtics players
Centers (basketball)
Cocodrilos de Caracas players
Dallas Mavericks draft picks
Dallas Mavericks players
Houston Rockets players
Liaoning Flying Leopards players
Los Angeles Clippers players
Michigan Wolverines men's basketball players
Minnesota Timberwolves players
Roseto Sharks players
21st-century African-American sportspeople
20th-century African-American sportspeople